Parque Temático 5 de Mayo is a park in the city of Puebla, in the Mexican state of Puebla.

References

External links

  (May 28, 2015)
  (May 28, 2015)

Parks in Mexico
Puebla (city)